The London Development Agency (LDA) was from July 2000 until 2012 the regional development agency for the London region in England. A functional body of the Greater London Authority, its purpose was to drive sustainable economic growth within London.

Projects were inherited from English Partnerships or carried out in collaboration with the Greater London Authority and other public sector organisations, including the Department for International Development, the British Council, and London College of Fashion, alongside London boroughs. Members of the Greater London Authority commissioned a 2008 report on these projects, followed by another in 2009.

The agency was closed on 31 March 2012 as a result of the coalition government's spending review. Some of its functions were assumed by the Greater London Authority itself; these included support for Visit London, Think London and Study London, and the administration of London's European Structural Funds programmes. The GLA was required by the Localism Act 2011 to take over LDA's assets and liabilities, which were placed into the ownership of a new subsidiary corporation – GLA Land and Property.

The LDA was based at Palestra, 197 Blackfriars Road, Southwark, south London (across the street from Southwark tube station). The LDA Olympic Land team was based at the London 2012 headquarters in Docklands.

Board
The board members were appointed by the Mayor of London, and were:

Chair: Harvey McGrath (London Development Agency)
Ann Humphries
Edmund Lazarus
Fran Beckett
Ian Barlow
James Cleverly AM
Jeremy Mayhew
 Mike Freer
Megan Dobney
Peter Truesdale
Steven Norris
Susan Angoy
Anthony Browne

Publications
Green Enterprise District: East London, July 2010

References

External links
Official website archived in May 2007
Visit London
Study London
CompeteFor

Economy of London
Local government in London
Regional development agencies
Greater London Authority functional bodies
2000 establishments in England
2012 disestablishments in England
Government agencies established in 2000
Government agencies disestablished in 2012